In general, a filler is something that is used to fill gaps. Specialized meanings include:

Materials
 Filler (animal food), dietary fiber and other ingredients added to pet foods to provide bulk
 Filler (materials), particles added to a matrix material, usually to improve its properties
 Filler (packaging), a machine designed to fill packaging, usually occurs in food packaging
 Filler metal, metal added in the making of a joint through welding, brazing, or soldering
 Grain filler, a product that is used to achieve a smooth-textured wood finish
 Injectable filler, a soft tissue filler injected into the skin to help fill in facial wrinkles
 Star filler, a plastic insert in computer cables which separates wires

Media and entertainment
 Filler (media), in television and other media, material that exists outside the story arc to pad out other material
 "Filler", song by hardcore punk band Minor Threat, from their debut E.P.

Other uses
 Filler (linguistics), a sound spoken to fill up gaps in utterances
 Filler (surname)
 Seat filler, a person who fills an empty seat during an event

See also 
 fillér, name of various small change coins throughout Hungarian history, and one hundredth of a Hungarian forint
 Filer (disambiguation)
 Placeholder (disambiguation)